Town Creek is a neighborhood in the Lake Highlands area of Dallas, Texas (USA).  It is generally bounded by Royal Lane on the south, Abrams Road on the west, Whitehurst Drive and Atherton Drive on the north, and a tributary of White Rock Creek on the east.  However, it generally excludes the apartments and shopping center located within those boundaries.

The neighborhood is a predominantly middle class and upper class area.  A creek trail which runs through the neighborhood along a tributary of White Rock Creek is popular for walkers, photographers, and nature-watchers.  Wildlife is abundant in the neighborhood.

Education 
Town Creek is located within the Richardson Independent School District.  Public school students living in the neighborhood are zoned to attend Skyview Elementary School, Forest Meadow Junior High, and Lake Highlands High School.